Heracleides of Magnesia, is known only as the author of a history of Mithridates VI of Pontus (Μιθριδατικά), which is lost.

Notes

Ancient Greek historians known only from secondary sources